Bellevue is a neighbourhood of Malmö, situated in the Borough of Limhamn-Bunkeflo, Malmö Municipality, Skåne County, Sweden. On the opposite site of the sound is Bellevue Strand

References

Neighbourhoods of Malmö